Skinner's Dress Suit is a 1926 American silent comedy film produced and distributed by Universal Pictures and starring Reginald Denny. William Seiter was the director of the film which was based on the 1916 novel of the name by Henry Irving Dodge. Laura La Plante and Hedda Hopper co-star in this comedy which has seen video and DVD releases.

A previous silent film based on this story had been made in 1917 directed by Harry Beaumont for the Essanay Company.

Plot
As described in a review in a film magazine, Honey (La Plante) idolizes her husband Skinner (Denny) and makes him demand a raise which is refused as Jackson (Braham), the biggest customer, has withdrawn his business. Honey has already told friends about the raise and Skinner has not the heart to tell her the truth. She starts spending the "raise" by making him buy a dress suit made by a Jewish tailor (Strauss). This new suit opens the way to social triumph which, of course, means more spending. At work, the plodding Skinner is starting to blossom out and has the stenographer (Morrissey) teach him the Charleston and gets caught by the boss. As the bills begin coming due, Skinner is fired but before he has a chance to tell Honey, she whisks him off to a society dance at a swell hotel. Jackson is stopping at the hotel and his pampered wife (Ward) insists she wants to go to the dance and that he must get someone to invite them. He finally picks on Skinner to obtain his invitation. Skinner and Honey's social triumph comes when they teach the jazzy steps of the Charleston to the village "society swells," and soon an odd assortment of human beings of all shapes, types, and sizes are lined up trying bravely to master the intricacies of this peppy dance. Before the evening is over, Skinner has landed the big Johnson contract. The next morning his ex-bosses are camping on Skinner's trail begging him to come back as a partner in the firm, and he pretends that he must give his bosses' offer due deliberation.

Cast

References

External links

Stills and review at moviessilently.com

1926 films
American silent feature films
Films directed by William A. Seiter
Universal Pictures films
Silent American comedy films
American black-and-white films
1926 comedy films
1920s American films